North Avondale is an economically diverse neighborhood in Cincinnati, Ohio. It is home to Xavier University and the Avon Woods Preserve. The population was 3,405 at the 2020 census.

Education
North Avondale is home to two elementary schools. North Avondale Montessori serves preschool through 6th grade and is part of the Cincinnati Public Schools system. The New School Montessori is a private elementary school serving preschool through 6th grade, and is accredited by the American Montessori Society.

Xavier University is partially located in North Avondale, and also offers a Montessori laboratory school for students ages 3-12.

References

External links
North Avondale Neighborhood Association
History of North Avondale

Neighborhoods in Cincinnati